Bob Krause may refer to: 

 Bob Krause (athletic director) (1945–2015), former athletic director for Kansas State University
 Bob Krause (politician) (born 1950), Democratic candidate for the United States Senate from Iowa in 2010

See also
Robert Kraus, author (1925–2001), cartoonist and publisher
Robert Kraus (footballer)
Robert Krausz (1936–2002), commodities trader